Willem Schippers (April 4, 1867 - Dordrecht, June 11, 1954) was a Dutch factory worker and writer who published over 45 Christian children's books and family novels during his lifetime.

Biography 
Schippers was born in Groote Lindt in Zwijndrecht, the youngest son of a mailman.  He worked initially as a blacksmith's boy in a forge in a village on the river Maas. Schippers then worked for five years in a machine factory, then later in a large factory in Dordrecht, as a metal turner.

In the evening after work, Schippers would write the stories he imagined during the work day.  He gained inspiration from his surroundings and the people around him.  Schippers found that writing helped him rest after the heavy work.

Schippers wrote his first book (title unknown) at age 33. In 1907, he published The Poacher and other titles.

Schippers died in 1954. In 1998, De Groot Goudriaan published a biography entitled "Willem Schippers (1867-1954): a life between pen and smith's hammer". In 2009, many of Schippers's books were reprinted  by De Ramshoorn publishers in Goes. Cover and interior illustrations were created by Rino Visser.

Bibliography

References
 A Hoogendijk; C D Hoogendijk; S A C Hoogendijk; W Schippers, Willem Schippers (1867-1954): een leven tussen pen en smidshamer.  ['A life between pen and smith's hammer'] De Groot Goudriaan, cop. 1998. [Dutch]

External links
Geni.com :Dates, family
Het Uilinest ("Owl's Nest",1909) at Project Gutenberg
Worldcat Identity
VIAF
LCNA

Dutch writers
Wikipedia requested images of artists
1867 births
1954 deaths